Lukša Andrić (born January 29, 1985) is a Croatian former professional basketball player. He stands 2.10 m tall and played center.

Croatian national team
He was also a regular Croatia national basketball team player.

External links

 TBLStat.net Profile
 Euroleague.net Profile
 Profile at Adriatic Basket
 FIBA.com Profile

1985 births
Living people
ABA League players
Bàsquet Manresa players
BC Astana players
Centers (basketball)
Competitors at the 2009 Mediterranean Games
Croatian expatriate basketball people in Spain
Croatian expatriate basketball people in Turkey
Croatian men's basketball players
Galatasaray S.K. (men's basketball) players
KK Cedevita players
KK Cibona players
Liga ACB players
Mediterranean Games gold medalists for Croatia
Mediterranean Games medalists in basketball
Basketball players from Dubrovnik
Szolnoki Olaj KK players
Türk Telekom B.K. players
2014 FIBA Basketball World Cup players
2010 FIBA World Championship players
KK Dubrava players